Ganeshanathan Jeganathan (born 28 October 1956, in Thondaimanaru) was a political writer and one of the members of former Tamil militant organization Tamil Eelam Liberation Organization (TELO). He was arrested and sentenced to death and was killed in the 1983 Welikada prison massacre during the Black July riots in Sri Lanka, along with the TELO leaders Nadarajah Thangathurai & Selvarajah Yogachandran.

See also

Nadarajah Thangathurai
Selvarajah Yogachandran

References

Sri Lankan Tamil rebels
Sri Lankan rebels
Tamil Eelam Liberation Organization militants
1983 deaths
1956 births